"Lot to Learn" is a song from American singer Luke Christopher, serving as a single from his EP TMRW. The song was written by Luke Hubbard. It was made available for digital download on September 11, 2015, through ByStorm Entertainment and RCA Records.

Track listing

Charts and certifications

Weekly charts

Certifications

References

2015 songs
2015 singles
RCA Records singles